HMS Dolphin was originally the steam merchant ship Seti built in 1902 by Sir Raylton Dixon & Co Ltd. She was purchased by the Admiralty for the Royal Navy in November 1914, renamed Pandora, and used as a depot ship. She was lost on her last trip while being towed to Cambois to be stripped of usable parts and scuttled as a blockship at Scapa Flow.

References 

Ships of the Royal Navy
Ships sunk by German submarines in World War II
Ships sunk by mines

1902 ships